Decagonocarpus is a genus of flowering plants belonging to the family Rutaceae.

Its native range is Eastern Colombia to Northwestern Brazil.

Species:

Decagonocarpus cornutus 
Decagonocarpus oppositifolius

References

Zanthoxyloideae
Zanthoxyloideae genera